I.H.C. (Ino) van den Besselaar (born 14 November 1948 in The Hague) is a former Dutch politician. As a member of the Party for Freedom (Partij voor de Vrijheid) he was an MP from 23 November 2010 to 19 September 2012, succeeding James Sharpe. He focused on matters of social affairs, pensions and government spending.

References 
  Parlement.com biography

1948 births
Living people
Members of the House of Representatives (Netherlands)
Party for Freedom politicians
Politicians from The Hague
21st-century Dutch politicians